La Conception is a village and municipality in the Laurentides region of Quebec, Canada, part of the Les Laurentides Regional County Municipality.

Demographics
Population trend:
 Population in 2021: 1527 (2016 to 2021 population change: 14.2%)
 Population in 2016: 1337 
 Population in 2011: 1287 
 Population in 2006: 1283
 Population in 2001: 1050
 Population in 1996: 917
 Population in 1991: 695

Private dwellings occupied by usual residents: 743 (total dwellings: 1229)

Mother tongue:
 English as first language: 6.5%
 French as first language: 89.9%
 English and French as first language: 0.7%
 Other as first language: 2.3%

Education

Sainte Agathe Academy (of the Sir Wilfrid Laurier School Board) in Sainte-Agathe-des-Monts serves English-speaking students in this community for both elementary and secondary levels.

References

Incorporated places in Laurentides
Municipalities in Quebec